The 2008–09 LEB season is the 13th season of the Liga Española de Baloncesto.  The 612-game regular season (34 games for each of the 18 teams) began on Thursday, September 18, 2008, and will end on Friday, May 15, 2009. The champion of the regular season will be promoted to ACB. The teams between 2nd and 9th position will play a best of 3 games play off to see who plays the Final Four. Two bottom teams will be relegated to LEB Plata.

LEB Oro Regular season 

1 CB Villa de Los Barrios relegated due economic problems.
2 Plus Pujol Lleida relegated to Liga EBA due economic problems.
3 CB Vic relegated due economic problems and sold its berth to CB Sant Josep Girona.
4 Gandía Bàsquet relegated to Liga EBA due economic problems.

LEB Oro playoffs

Quarterfinals
Each quarterfinal was a best-of-three (if third serie necessary) series between teams in the 2-9 positions, with the best-place team receiving home advantage. All opening games were played on May 19, 2009, and all second games were played on May 22. The deciding third games were played on May 24.

* if necessary

Final Four
The Final Four is the last phase of the LEB Oro season, and is held over a weekend in Fuenlabrada. The semifinal games are played on May 30. The championship final is played on May 31.

Stats Leaders

Points

Rebounds

Assists

MVP Week by Week

External links
Spanish Basketball Federation

LEB Oro seasons
LEB2
Second level Spanish basketball league seasons